Penicillium polonicum is a species of fungus in the genus Penicillium which produces penicillic acid, verucosidin, patulin, anacine, 3-methoxyviridicatin and glycopeptides. Penicillium polonicum can spoil cereals, peanuts, onions, dried meats, citrus fruits

Further reading

References 

polonicum
Fungi described in 1927